Killeedy GAA is a Gaelic Athletic Association club located in the parish of Killeedy, County Limerick, Ireland. The club is primarily concerned with the game of hurling.

History

Located in Raheenagh in the parish of Killeedy, County Limerick, Killeedy GAA Club was founded in 1932. The club has spent most of its existence operating in the junior grade, winning three Limerick JBHC titles. The club's greatest success came in 1980 when South Liberties were beaten by 2–07 to 1–07 to claim the Limerick SHC for the only time in their history.

The club has organised its own Leinster, Munster and All-Ireland JBHC competitions since 2005.

Honours

Limerick Senior Hurling Championship (1): 1980
Limerick Intermediate Hurling Championship (1): 1992
Limerick Junior B Football Championship (1): 1987
Limerick Junior B Hurling Championship (3): 1988, 2005, 2010

Notable players

 Paudie Fitzmaurice: All-Ireland SHC winner (1973)
 Willie Fitzmaurice: All-Ireland SHC runner-up (1980)

References

Gaelic games clubs in County Limerick
Hurling clubs in County Limerick